Our Gang (also known as  The Little Rascals or Hal Roach's Rascals) is an American series of comedy short films chronicling a group of poor neighborhood children and their adventures. Created by film producer Hal Roach, also the producer of the Laurel and Hardy films, Our Gang shorts were produced from 1922 to 1944, spanning the silent film and early sound film periods of American cinema. Our Gang is noted for showing children behaving in a relatively natural way; Roach and original director Robert F. McGowan worked to film the unaffected, raw nuances apparent in regular children, rather than have them imitate adult acting styles. The series also broke new ground by portraying white and black children interacting as equals during the Jim Crow era of racial segregation in the United States.

The franchise began in 1922 as a silent short subject series produced by the Roach studio and released by Pathé Exchange. Roach changed distributors from Pathé to Metro-Goldwyn-Mayer (MGM) in 1927, and the series entered its most popular period after converting to sound in 1929. Production continued at Roach until 1938, when the Our Gang production unit was sold to MGM, where production continued until 1944. Across 220 short films and a feature-film spin-off, General Spanky, the Our Gang series featured more than 41 child actors as regular members of its cast.
 
As MGM retained the rights to the Our Gang trademark after buying the series, the Roach-produced sound Our Gang films were re-released to theaters and syndicated for television under the title The Little Rascals. Roach's The Little Rascals package, currently owned by CBS Media Ventures, and MGM's Our Gang package, currently owned by Turner Entertainment and distributed by Warner Bros., have since remained in syndication.  New productions based on the shorts have been made over the years, including a 1994 feature film, The Little Rascals, released by Universal Pictures.

Series overview
Unlike many motion pictures featuring children and based in fantasy, producer/creator Hal Roach rooted Our Gang in real life: most of the children were poor, and the gang was often at odds with snobbish "rich kids," officious adults, parents, and other such adversaries.

Directorial approach
Senior director Robert F. McGowan helmed most of the Our Gang shorts until 1933, assisted by his nephew Anthony Mack. McGowan worked to develop a style that allowed the children to be as natural as possible, downplaying the importance of the filmmaking equipment. Scripts were written for the shorts by the Hal Roach comedy writing staff, which included at various times Leo McCarey, Frank Capra, Walter Lantz, and Frank Tashlin, among others. The children, some too young to read, rarely saw the scripts; instead, McGowan would explain the scene to be filmed to each child immediately before it was shot, directing the children using a megaphone and encouraging improvisation.

When sound came in at the end of the 1920s, McGowan modified his approach slightly, but scripts were not adhered to until McGowan left the series. Later Our Gang directors, such as Gus Meins and Gordon Douglas, streamlined the approach to McGowan's methods to meet the demands of the increasingly sophisticated movie industry of the mid-to-late 1930s. Douglas, in particular, had to streamline his films, as he directed Our Gang after Roach halved the running times of the shorts from two reels (20 minutes) to one reel (10 minutes).

Finding and replacing the cast
As children aged out of their roles, they were replaced by new children, usually from the Los Angeles area. Eventually Our Gang talent scouting employed large-scale national contests in which thousands of children tried out for an open role. For example, Norman Chaney ("Chubby"), Matthew Beard ("Stymie"), and Billie "Buckwheat" Thomas all won contests to become members of the gang: Chaney replaced Joe Cobb, Beard replaced Allen Hoskins ("Farina"), and Thomas replaced Beard.

Even when there was no talent search, the studio was bombarded by requests from parents who were sure their children were perfect for the series. Among them were the future child stars Mickey Rooney and Shirley Temple, neither of whom made it past the audition.

Minority cast members 

The Our Gang series produced during the Jim Crow-era is notable for being one of the first in cinema history in which African Americans and White Americans were portrayed as equals. The five black child actors who held main roles in the series were Ernie Morrison, Allen Hoskins, Eugene Jackson, Matthew Beard and Billie Thomas. Ernie Morrison was, in fact, the first black actor signed to a long-term contract in Hollywood history and the first major black star in Hollywood history.

The African-American characters have often been criticized as racial stereotypes. The Black children spoke (or were indicated as speaking via text titles in the case of the silent entries) in a stereotypical "Negro dialect", and several controversial gags revolved directly around their skin color: Matthew Beard's Stymie character sweating jet-black ink,  Billie Thomas' Buckwheat character being given fake "white measles" instead of dark ones and supposedly turned into a monkey,  and so forth. One early Our Gang short, Lodge Night (1924), revolves around the kids forming a parody club based on the Ku Klux Klan (though the Black children are still allowed to join).

In their adult years, actors Morrison, Beard, and Thomas defended the series, arguing that the white characters in the series were similarly stereotyped: the "freckle-faced kid", the "fat kid", the "neighborhood bully", the "pretty blond girl", and the "mischievous toddler". In an interview on Tom Snyder's The Tomorrow Show in 1974, Matthew Beard said of his time in the series that "I feel it was great. Some of the lines I had to say I didn't like, but I never look at it like that. I just try to look at it as mostly a fun thing. We were just a group of kids who were having fun." In a separate interview, Ernie Morrison stated, "When it came to race, Hal Roach was color-blind."

Despite the stereotyping and racial gags, Our Gang's integrated cast caused it to be disliked by certain theater owners in the southern United States. Early in the existence of Our Gang, these theater owners complained to Pathé that Morrison and Hoskins had too much screen time and their prominence in the shorts would offend white audiences. A later Our Gang spin-off film, Curley (1947), was banned by the Memphis, Tennessee, censor board for showing black and white children in school together, a characteristic common to even the earlier shorts. Other minorities, including Asian Americans Sing Joy, Allen Tong (also known as Alan Dong), and Edward Soo Hoo; and Italian American actor Mickey Gubitosi (later known as Robert Blake), were depicted in the series with varying levels of stereotyping.

History

1922–1925: Early years
According to Roach, the idea for Our Gang came to him in 1921, when he was auditioning a child actress to appear in a film. The girl was, in his opinion, overly made up and overly rehearsed, and Roach waited for the audition to be over. After the girl and her mother left the office, Roach looked out of his window to a lumberyard across the street, where he saw some children having an argument. The children had all taken sticks from the lumberyard to play with, but the smallest child had the biggest stick, and the others were trying to force him to give it to the biggest child. After realizing that he had been watching the children bicker for 15 minutes, Roach thought a short film series about children just being themselves might be a success.

Our Gang also had its roots in an aborted Roach short-subject series revolving around the adventures of a black boy called "Sunshine Sammy", played by Ernie Morrison. Theater owners then were wary of booking shorts focused on a black boy, and the series ended after just one entry, The Pickaninny, was produced. Morrison's "Sunshine Sammy" instead became one of the foci of the new Our Gang series.

Under the supervision of Charley Chase, work began on the first two-reel shorts in the new "kids-and-pets" series, to be called Hal Roach's Rascals, later that year. Director Fred C. Newmeyer helmed the first pilot film, entitled Our Gang, but Roach scrapped Newmeyer's work and had former fireman Robert F. McGowan reshoot the short. Roach tested it at several theaters around Hollywood. The attendees were very receptive, and the press clamored for "lots more of those 'Our Gang' comedies." The colloquial usage of the term Our Gang led to its becoming the series' second (yet more popular) official title, with the title cards reading "Our Gang Comedies: Hal Roach presents His Rascals in..." The series was officially called both Our Gang and Hal Roach's Rascals until 1932, when Our Gang became the sole title of the series.

The first cast of Our Gang was recruited primarily of children recommended to Roach by studio employees, with the exception of Ernie Morrison, under contract to Roach. The other Our Gang recruits included Roach photographer Gene Kornman's daughter Mary Kornman, their friends' son Mickey Daniels, and family friends Allen Hoskins, Jack Davis, Jackie Condon, and Joe Cobb. Most early shorts were filmed outdoors and on location and featured a menagerie of animal characters, such as Dinah the Mule.

Roach's distributor Pathé released One Terrible Day, the fourth short produced for the series, as the first Our Gang short on September 10, 1922; the pilot Our Gang was not released until November 5. The Our Gang series was a success from the start, with the children's naturalism, the funny animal actors, and McGowan's direction making a successful combination. The shorts did well at the box office, and by the end of the decade the Our Gang children were pictured on numerous product endorsements.

The biggest Our Gang stars then were Ernie Morrison as Sunshine Sammy, Mickey Daniels, Mary Kornman, and Allen Hoskins as little Farina, who eventually became the most popular member of the 1920s gang and the most popular black child star of the 1920s. A reviewer wrote of the Farina character — depicted as female though played by a male child — in Photoplay: "The honors go to a very young lady of color, billed as 'Little Farina.' Scarcely two years old, she goes through each set like a wee, sombre shadow." Daniels and Kornman were very popular and were often paired in Our Gang and a later teen version of the series called The Boy Friends, which Roach produced from 1930 to 1932. Other early Our Gang children were Eugene Jackson as Pineapple, Scooter Lowry, Andy Samuel, Johnny Downs, Winston and Weston Doty, and Jay R. Smith.

1926–1929: New faces and new distributors
After Ernie, Mickey and Mary left the series in the mid-1920s, the Our Gang series entered a transitional period. The stress of directing child actors forced Robert McGowan to take doctor-mandated sabbaticals for exhaustion, leaving his nephew Robert A. McGowan (credited as Anthony Mack) to direct many shorts in this period. The Mack-directed shorts are considered among the lesser entries in the series. New faces included Bobby Hutchins as Wheezer, Harry Spear, Jean Darling and Mary Ann Jackson, while stalwart Farina served as the series' anchor.

Also at this time, the Our Gang cast acquired an American Pit Bull Terrier with a ring around one eye, originally named Pansy but soon known as Pete the Pup, the most famous Our Gang pet. In 1927, Roach ended his distribution arrangement with the Pathé company. He signed on to release future products through the newly formed Metro-Goldwyn-Mayer, which released its first Our Gang comedy in September 1927. The move to MGM offered Roach larger budgets and the chance to have his films packaged with MGM features to the Loews Theatres chain.

Some shorts around this time, particularly Spook Spoofing (1928, one of only two three-reelers in the Our Gang canon), contained extended scenes of the gang tormenting and teasing Farina, scenes which helped spur the claims of racism, which many other shorts did not warrant. These shorts marked the departure of Jackie Condon, who had been with the group from the beginning of the series.

1928–1931: Entering the sound era
Starting in 1928, Our Gang comedies were distributed with phonographic discs that contained synchronized music-and-sound-effect tracks for the shorts. In spring 1929, the Roach sound stages were converted for sound recording, and Our Gang made its "all-talking" debut in April 1929 with the 25-minute film Small Talk. It took a year for McGowan and the gang to fully adjust to talking pictures, during which time they lost Joe Cobb, Jean Darling and Harry Spear and added Norman Chaney, Dorothy DeBorba, Matthew "Stymie" Beard, Donald Haines and Jackie Cooper.

Cooper proved to be the personality the series had been missing since Mickey Daniels left and was featured prominently in three 1930/1931 Our Gang films: Teacher's Pet, School's Out, and Love Business. These three shorts explored Jackie Cooper's crush on the new schoolteacher Miss Crabtree, played by June Marlowe. Cooper soon won the lead role in Paramount's feature film Skippy, and Roach sold his contract to MGM in 1931. Other Our Gang members appearing in the early sound shorts included Buddy McDonald, Clifton Young, and Shirley Jean Rickert. Many also appeared in a group cameo appearance in the all-star comedy short The Stolen Jools (1931).

Beginning with the short When the Wind Blows, in 1930 background music scores were added to the soundtracks of most of the Our Gang films. Initially, the music consisted of orchestral versions of then-popular tunes. Marvin Hatley had served as the music director of Hal Roach Studios since 1929, and RCA employee Leroy Shield joined the company as a part-time musical director in mid-1930. Hatley and Shield's jazz-influenced scores, first featured in Our Gang with 1930s Pups is Pups, became recognizable trademarks of Our Gang, Laurel and Hardy, and the other Roach series and films. Another 1930 short, Teacher's Pet, marked the first use of the Our Gang theme song, "Good Old Days", composed by Shield and featuring a notable saxophone solo. Shield and Hatley's scores supported Our Gang's on-screen action regularly through 1934, after which series entries with background scores became less frequent.

In 1930, Roach began production on The Boy Friends, a short-subject series which was essentially a teenaged version of Our Gang. Featuring Our Gang alumni Mickey Daniels and Mary Kornman among its cast, The Boy Friends was produced for two years, with fifteen installments in total.

1931–1933: Transition
Jackie Cooper left Our Gang in early 1931 just before another wave of cast changes: Farina Hoskins, Chubby Chaney, and Mary Ann Jackson all departed a few months afterward. Our Gang entered another transitional period, similar to that of the mid-1920s. Matthew Beard, Wheezer Hutchins, and Dorothy DeBorba carried the series during this period, aided by Sherwood Bailey and Kendall McComas, who would play Breezy Brisbane. Unlike the mid-1920s period, McGowan sustained the quality of the series with the help of the several regular cast members and the Roach writing staff. Many of these shorts include early appearances of Jerry Tucker and Wally Albright, who later became series regulars.

New Roach discovery George McFarland joined the gang as Spanky late in 1931 at the age of three and remained an Our Gang actor for eleven years, except for a brief break in summer 1938. At first appearing as the tag-along toddler of the group, and later finding an accomplice in Scotty Beckett in 1934, Spanky quickly became Our Gangs biggest child star. He won parts in a number of outside features, appeared in many of the now-numerous Our Gang product endorsements and spin-off merchandise items, and popularized the expressions "Okey-dokey!" and "Okey-doke!"

Dickie Moore, a veteran child actor, joined in the middle of 1932 and remained with the series for one year. Other members in these years included Mary Ann Jackson's brother Dickie Jackson, John "Uh-huh" Collum, and Tommy Bond. Upon Dickie Moore's departure in mid 1933, long-term Our Gang members such as Wheezer (who had been with Our Gang since the late Pathé silents period) and Dorothy left the series as well.

1933–1936: New directions
Robert McGowan, burned out from the stress of working with the child actors, had as early as 1931 tried to resign as producer/director of Our Gang. Lacking a replacement, Hal Roach persuaded him to stay on for another year. At the start of the 1933–34 season, the Our Gang series format was significantly altered to accommodate McGowan and persuade him to stay another year. The first two entries of the season in fall 1933, Bedtime Worries and Wild Poses (which featured a cameo by Laurel and Hardy), focused on Spanky and his hapless parents, portrayed by Gay Seabrook and Emerson Treacy, in a family-oriented situation comedy format similar to the style later popular on television. A smaller cast of Our Gang kids—Matthew Beard, Tommy Bond, Jerry Tucker, and Georgie Billings—were featured in supporting roles with reduced screen time.

An unsatisfied McGowan abruptly left after Wild Poses. Coupled with a brief suspension in McFarland's work permit, Our Gang went into a four-month hiatus, during which the series was revised to a format similar to its original style and German-born Gus Meins was hired as the new series director.

Hi-Neighbor!, released in March 1934, ended the hiatus and was the first series entry directed by Meins, a veteran of the once-competing Buster Brown short subject series. Gordon Douglas served as Meins's assistant director, and Fred Newmeyer alternated directorial duties with Meins for a handful of shorts. Meins's Our Gang shorts were less improvisational than McGowan's and featured a heavier reliance on dialogue. McGowan returned two years later to direct his Our Gang swan song, Divot Diggers, released in 1936.

Retaining McFarland, Matthew Beard, Tommy Bond, and Jerry Tucker, the revised series added Scotty Beckett, Wally Albright, and Billie Thomas, who soon began playing the character of Stymie's sister "Buckwheat," though Thomas was a male. Semi-regular actors, such as Jackie Lynn Taylor, Marianne Edwards, and Leonard Kibrick as the neighborhood bully, joined the series at this time. Tommy Bond and Wally Albright left in the middle of 1934; Jackie Lynn Taylor and Marianne Edwards would depart by 1935.

Early in 1935, new cast members Carl Switzer and his brother Harold joined Our Gang after impressing Roach with an impromptu musical performance at the studio commissary. While Harold would eventually be relegated to the role of a background player, Carl, nicknamed "Alfalfa," eventually replaced Scotty Beckett as Spanky's sidekick. Matthew Beard as Stymie left the cast soon after, and the Buckwheat character morphed subtly into a male. That same year, Darla Hood, Patsy May, and Eugene Lee as Porky joined the gang. Scotty Beckett departed for a career in features (he returned in 1939 for two shorts, Cousin Wilbur and Dog Daze).

The final Roach years
Our Gang was very successful during the 1920s and the early 1930s. However, by 1934, many movie theater owners were increasingly dropping two-reel (20-minute) comedies like Our Gang and the Laurel & Hardy series from their bills and running double feature programs instead. The Laurel & Hardy series went from film shorts to features exclusively in mid 1935. By 1936, Hal Roach began debating plans to discontinue Our Gang until Louis B. Mayer, head of Roach's distributor MGM, persuaded Roach to keep the popular series in production. Roach agreed, producing shorter, one-reel Our Gang comedies (ten minutes in length instead of twenty). The first one-reel Our Gang short, Bored of Education (1936), marked the Our Gang directorial debut of former assistant director Gordon Douglas and won the Academy Award for Best Short Subject (One Reel) in 1937.

As part of the arrangement with MGM to continue Our Gang, Roach received the clearance to produce an Our Gang feature film, General Spanky, hoping that he might move the series to features as was done with Laurel & Hardy. Directed by Gordon Douglas and Fred Newmeyer, General Spanky featured characters Spanky, Buckwheat, and Alfalfa in a sentimental, Shirley Temple-esque story set during the American Civil War. The film focused more on the adult leads (Phillips Holmes and Rosina Lawrence) than the children and was a box office disappointment. No further Our Gang features were made.

After years of gradual cast changes, the troupe standardized in 1936 with the move to one-reel shorts. Most casual fans of Our Gang are particularly familiar with the 1936–1939 incarnation of the cast: Spanky, Alfalfa, Darla, Buckwheat, and Porky, with recurring characters such as neighborhood bullies Butch and Woim and the bookworm Waldo. Tommy Bond, an off-and-on member of the gang since 1932, returned to the series as Butch beginning with the 1937 short Glove Taps. Sidney Kibrick, the younger brother of Leonard Kibrick, played Butch's crony, Woim.

Glove Taps also featured the first appearance of Darwood Kaye as the bespectacled, foppish Waldo. In later shorts, both Butch and Waldo were portrayed as Alfalfa's rivals in his pursuit of Darla's affections. Other popular elements in these mid-to-late-1930s shorts include the "He-Man Woman Haters Club" from Hearts Are Thumps and Mail and Female (both 1937), the Laurel and Hardy-ish interaction between Alfalfa and Spanky, and the comic tag-along team of Porky and Buckwheat.

Roach produced the final two-reel Our Gang short, a high-budget musical special entitled Our Gang Follies of 1938, in 1937 as a parody of MGM's Broadway Melody of 1938. In Follies of 1938, Alfalfa, who aspires to be an opera singer, falls asleep and dreams that his old pal Spanky has become the rich owner of a swanky Broadway nightclub where Darla and Buckwheat perform, making "hundreds and thousands of dollars."

As the profit margins continued to decline owing to double features, Roach could no longer afford to continue producing Our Gang. However, MGM did not want the series discontinued and agreed to take over production. On May 31, 1938, Roach sold MGM the Our Gang unit, including the rights to the name and the contracts for the actors and writers, for $25,000 (equal to $ today). After delivering the Laurel and Hardy feature Block-Heads, Roach also ended his distribution contract with MGM, moving to United Artists and leaving the short-subjects business. The final Roach-produced short in the Our Gang series, Hide and Shriek, was his final short-subject production.

The MGM era
The Little Ranger was the first Our Gang short to be produced in-house at MGM. Gordon Douglas was loaned out from Hal Roach Studios to direct The Little Ranger and another early MGM short, Aladdin's Lantern, while MGM hired newcomer George Sidney as the permanent series director. Our Gang would be used by MGM as a training ground for future feature directors: Sidney, Edward Cahn and Cy Endfield all worked on Our Gang before moving on to features. Another director, Herbert Glazer, remained a second-unit director outside of his work on the series.

Nearly all of the 52 MGM-produced Our Gangs were written by former Roach director Hal Law and former junior director Robert A. McGowan (also known as Anthony Mack, nephew of former senior Our Gang director Robert F. McGowan). Robert A. McGowan was credited for these shorts as "Robert McGowan"; as a result, moviegoers have been confused for decades about whether this Robert McGowan and the senior director of the same name at Roach were two separate people.

The last few of the Roach comedies featured Alfalfa Switzer as the lead character; Spanky McFarland had departed from the series just before its sale to MGM. Casting his replacement was delayed until after the move to MGM, at which point MGM rehired McFarland.

In 1939, Mickey Gubitosi (later known by the stage name of Robert Blake) replaced Eugene "Porky" Lee, who had matured too quickly. Tommy Bond, Darwood Kaye, and Alfalfa Switzer all left the series in 1940, and Billy "Froggy" Laughlin (with his Popeye-esque trick voice) and Janet Burston were added to the cast. By the end of 1941, Darla Hood had departed from the series, and Spanky McFarland followed her within a year. Billie Thomas as Buckwheat remained in the cast until the end of the series as the sole holdover from the Roach era.

Overall, the Our Gang films produced by MGM were not as well-received as the Roach-produced shorts had been, largely due to MGM's inexperience with the brand of slapstick comedy that Our Gang was famous for, and to MGM's insistence on keeping Alfalfa, Spanky, and Buckwheat in the series as they became teens. The MGM entries are considered by many film historians, and the Our Gang children themselves, to be lesser films than the Roach entries. The children's performances were criticized as stilted and stiff, their dialogue being recited instead of spoken naturally. Adult situations often drove the action, with each film often incorporating a moral, a civics lesson, or a patriotic theme. The series was given a permanent setting in the fictitious town of Greenpoint, and the mayhem caused by the Our Gang kids was toned down significantly.

Exhibitors noticed the drop in quality, and often complained that the series was slipping. When six of the 13 shorts released between 1942 and 1943 sustained losses rather than turning profits, MGM discontinued Our Gang. The final short was Dancing Romeo, which was released on April 29, 1944 (as an MGM Miniature, not an Our Gang comedy).

Since 1937, Our Gang had been featured as a licensed comic strip in the UK comic The Dandy, drawn by Dudley D. Watkins. Starting in 1942, MGM licensed Our Gang to Dell Comics for the publication of Our Gang Comics, featuring the gang, Barney Bear, and Tom and Jerry. The strips in The Dandy ended three years after the demise of the Our Gang shorts, in 1947. Our Gang Comics outlasted the series by five years, changing its name to Tom and Jerry Comics in 1949. In 2006, Fantagraphics Books began issuing a series of volumes reprinting the Our Gang stories, mostly written and drawn by Pogo creator Walt Kelly.

Later years and The Little Rascals revival

The Little Rascals television package
When Roach sold Our Gang to MGM, he retained the option to buy the rights to the Our Gang trademark, provided he produced no more children's comedies in the Our Gang vein. In the late 1940s, he created a new film property in the Our Gang mold and forfeited his right to buy back the name Our Gang to obtain permission to produce two Cinecolor featurettes, Curley and Who Killed Doc Robbin. Neither film was critically or financially successful, and Roach turned to re-releasing the original Our Gang comedies.

In 1949, MGM sold Roach the back catalog of 1927–1938 Our Gang silent and talking shorts, while retaining the rights to the Our Gang name, the 52 Our Gang films it produced, and the feature General Spanky. Under the terms of the sale, Roach was required to remove the MGM Lion studio logo and all instances of the names or logos "Metro-Goldwyn-Mayer", "Loew's Incorporated", and Our Gang from the reissued film prints. Using a modified version of the series' original name, Roach repackaged 79 of the 80 sound Our Gang shorts as The Little Rascals. By all accounts available, none of the former child stars were ever paid a cent in residuals from this, despite the substantial profits netted.  Monogram Pictures and its successor, Allied Artists, reissued the films to theaters beginning in 1950. Allied Artists' television department, Interstate Television, syndicated the films to TV in 1954.

Under its new name, The Little Rascals enjoyed renewed popularity on television, and new Little Rascals comic books, toys, and other licensed merchandise were produced. MGM prepared to distribute its own Our Gang shorts to television in 1957, and offers for the shorts to stations began to be made in 1958. The two separate packages of Our Gang films competed with each other in syndication for three decades. Some stations bought both packages and played them alongside each other under the Little Rascals show banner.

The television rights to the silent Pathé Our Gang comedies were sold to National Telepix and other distributors, who distributed the films under titles such as The Mischief Makers and Those Lovable Scallawags with Their Gangs.

King World's acquisition and edits
In 1963, Hal Roach Studios, by then run by Roach's son Hal Jr, filed for bankruptcy. A struggling novice syndication agent named Charles King purchased the television rights to The Little Rascals in the bankruptcy proceedings and returned the shorts to television. The success of The Little Rascals paved the way for King's new company, King World Productions, to grow into one of the largest television syndicators in the world.  Currently, Paramount Global, King World's latest successor, handles distribution rights.

In 1971, because of controversy over some dated racial humor in the shorts and other content deemed to be in bad taste, King World made significant edits to Little Rascals TV prints. Many series entries were trimmed by two to four minutes, while others (among them Spanky, Bargain Day, The Pinch Singer and Mush and Milk) were cut to nearly half of their original length.

At the same time, eight Little Rascals shorts were pulled from the King World television package altogether. Lazy Days, Moan and Groan, Inc., the Stepin Fetchit-guest-starred A Tough Winter, Little Daddy,  A Lad an' a Lamp, The Kid From Borneo, and Little Sinner were deleted from the syndication package because of perceived racism, while Big Ears was deleted for its depiction of carelessly ingesting an assortment of drugs out of a medicine cabinet. The early talkie Railroadin' was never part of the television package because its soundtrack (recorded on phonographic records) was considered lost, although it was later found and restored to the film.

Turner Entertainment acquired the classic MGM library in 1986, and the 1938–44 MGM-produced Our Gang shorts were shown on Turner's TBS and TNT cable networks for many years as early-morning programming filler, with a regular slot on Sundays at 6 am ET on TNT.

In the early 2000s, the 71 films in the King World package were re-edited, reinstating many (though not all) edits made in 1971 and the original Our Gang title cards. These new television prints made their debut on the American Movie Classics cable network in 2001 and ran until 2003.

New Little Rascals productions
Many producers, including Our Gang alumnus Jackie Cooper, made pilots for new Little Rascals television series, but none ever went into production.

In 1977, Norman Lear tried to revive the Rascals franchise, taping three pilot episodes of The Little Rascals. The pilots were not bought, but were notable for including Gary Coleman.

1979 brought The Little Rascals Christmas Special, an animated holiday special produced by Murakami-Wolf-Swenson, written by Romeo Muller and featuring the voice work of Darla Hood (who died suddenly before the special aired) and Matthew "Stymie" Beard.

From 1982 to 1984, Hanna-Barbera Productions produced a Saturday morning cartoon version of The Little Rascals, which aired on ABC during The Pac-Man/Little Rascals/Richie Rich Show (later The Monchichis/Little Rascals/Richie Rich Show). It starred the voices of Patty Maloney as Darla; Peter Cullen as Petey and Officer Ed; Scott Menville as Spanky; Julie McWhirter Dees as Alfalfa, Porky and The Woim; Shavar Ross as Buckwheat, and B.J. Ward as Butch and Waldo.

In 1994, Amblin Entertainment and Universal Pictures released The Little Rascals, a feature film based loosely on the series and featuring interpretations of classic Our Gang shorts, including Hearts are Thumps, Rushin' Ballet, and Hi'-Neighbor! The film, directed by Penelope Spheeris, starred Travis Tedford as Spanky, Bug Hall as Alfalfa, and Ross Bagley as Buckwheat; with cameos by the Olsen twins, Whoopi Goldberg, Mel Brooks, Reba McEntire, Daryl Hannah, Donald Trump and Raven-Symoné. The Little Rascals was a moderate success for Universal, bringing in $51,764,950 at the box office.

In 2014, Universal Pictures released a direct-to-video film, The Little Rascals Save the Day. This was a second film loosely based on the series and featuring interpretations of classic Our Gang shorts, including Helping Grandma, Mike Fright, and Birthday Blues. The film was directed by Alex Zamm, and starred Jet Jurgensmeyer as Spanky, Drew Justice as Alfalfa, Eden Wood as Darla, and Doris Roberts as the kids' adopted Grandma.

Legacy and influence
 The characters in this series are well-known cultural icons, and identified solely by their first names. The characters of Alfalfa, Spanky, Buckwheat, Porky, Darla, Froggy, Butch, Woim, and Waldo were especially well known. Like many child actors, the Our Gang children were typecast and had trouble outgrowing their Our Gang images.

Several Our Gang alumni, among them Carl "Alfalfa" Switzer, Scotty Beckett, Norman "Chubby" Chaney, Billy "Froggy" Laughlin, Donald Haines, Bobby "Wheezer" Hutchins, Darla Hood, Matthew "Stymie" Beard, Billie "Buckwheat" Thomas, and George "Spanky" McFarland, died before age 65, in most cases well earlier. This led to rumors of an Our Gang/Little Rascals "curse", rumors further popularized by a 2002 E! True Hollywood Story documentary entitled "The Curse of the Little Rascals". The Snopes.com website debunks the rumor of an Our Gang curse, stating that there was no pattern of unusual deaths when taking all of the major Our Gang stars into account, despite the deaths of a select few.

The children's work in the series was largely unrewarded in later years, although Spanky McFarland was given a star on the Hollywood Walk of Fame posthumously in 1994. Neither he nor any other Our Gang children received any residuals or royalties from reruns of the shorts or licensed products with their likenesses. The only remittances were their weekly salaries during their time in the gang, ranging from $40 a week for newcomers to $200 or more weekly for stars like Farina, Spanky, and Alfalfa.

One notable exception was Jackie Cooper, who was later nominated for an Academy Award and had a career as an adult actor. Cooper is known today for portraying Perry White in the 1978–1987 Superman movies, and for directing episodes of TV series such as M*A*S*H and Superboy. Another was Robert Blake, who found great success in the 1960s and 1970s as an actor, with films like In Cold Blood (1967) and television shows like Baretta (1975–78), which netted him an Emmy Award.

The 1930 Our Gang short Pups is Pups was an inductee of the 2004 National Film Registry list.

E. L. Doctorow's 1975 novel Ragtime ends with the character of Tateh, a Jewish immigrant from Eastern Europe, having a vision of the kind of film he wants to make: "A bunch of children who were pals, white black, fat thin, rich poor, all kinds, mischievous little urchins who would have funny adventures in their own neighborhood, a society of ragamuffins, like all of us, a gang, getting into trouble and getting out again." The implication is that Tateh will go on to produce the Our Gang series.

Imitators, followers, and frauds
Due to the popularity of Our Gang, many similar kid comedy short film series were created by competing studios. Among the most notable are The Kiddie Troupers, featuring future comedian Eddie Bracken; Baby Burlesks, featuring Shirley Temple; the Buster Brown comedies (from which Our Gang received Pete the Pup and director Gus Meins); and Our Gang's main competitor, the Toonerville Trolley-based Mickey McGuire series starring Mickey Rooney. Less notable imitations series include The McDougall Alley Gang (Bray Productions, 1927–1928), The Us Bunch and Our Kids. There is evidence that Our Gang-style productions were filmed in small towns and cities around the country using local children actors in the 1920s and 1930s. These productions did not appear to be affiliated with Hal Roach, but often used storylines from the shorts of the period, and sometimes went so far as to identify themselves as being Our Gang productions.

In later years, many adults falsely claimed to have been members of Our Gang. A long list of people, including persons famous in other capacities such as Nanette Fabray, Eddie Bracken, and gossip columnist Joyce Haber claimed to be or have been publicly called former Our Gang children. Bracken's official biography was once altered to state that he appeared in Our Gang instead of The Kiddie Troupers, although he himself had no knowledge of the change.

Among notable Our Gang imposters is Jack Bothwell, who claimed to have portrayed a character named "Freckles", going so far as to appear on the game show To Tell the Truth in the fall of 1957, perpetuating this fraud. In 2008, a Darla Hood impostor, Mollie Barron, died claiming to have appeared as Darla in Our Gang. Another is Bill English, a grocery store employee who appeared on the October 5, 1990, episode of the ABC investigative television newsmagazine 20/20 claiming to have been Buckwheat. Following the broadcast, Spanky McFarland informed the media of the truth, and in December, William Thomas, Jr. (son of Billie Thomas, the person who played Buckwheat) filed a lawsuit against ABC for negligence.

Persons and entities named after Our Gang
A number of groups, companies, and entities have been inspired by or named after Our Gang. The folk-rock group Spanky and Our Gang was named for the troupe because lead singer Elaine "Spanky" McFarlane's last name was similar to that of George "Spanky" McFarland. The band had no connection with the actual Our Gang series.

Numerous unauthorized Little Rascals and Our Gang restaurants and day care centers also exist throughout the United States.

Home media

1951–1992: 16 mm and VHS releases
In the 1950s, home movie distributor Official Films released many of the Hal Roach talkies on 16 mm film. These were released as "Famous Kid Comedies," as Official could not use "Our Gang". The company's licensing only lasted for a short period. For years afterward, Blackhawk Films released 79 of the 80 Roach talkies on 8mm and 16 mm film. The sound discs for Railroadin'  had been lost since the 1940s, and a silent print was available for home movie release until 1982, when the film's sound discs were located in the MGM vault and the short was restored with sound. Like the television prints, Blackhawk's Little Rascals reissues featured custom title cards in place of the original Our Gang logos, per MGM's 1949 arrangement with Hal Roach not to distribute the series under its original title. The films were otherwise offered unedited.

In 1983, with the VHS home video market growing, Blackhawk began distributing Little Rascals VHS tapes through catalog orders, with three shorts per tape. Blackhawk Films was acquired in 1983 by National Telefilm Associates, later renamed Republic Pictures. Republic would release Little Rascals VHS volumes for retail purchase in non-comprehensive collections through the rest of the 1980s and early 1990s. By then, all but 11 of the Roach-era sound films were available on home video.

1993–2011: Cabin Fever/Hallmark VHS and DVD releases
In 1993, Republic Pictures Home Video sold the home video rights for the 80 sound Roach shorts and some available silent shorts to Cabin Fever Entertainment. Cabin Fever acquired the rights to use the original Our Gang title cards and MGM logos, and for the first time in over 50 years, the Roach sound Our Gang comedies could be commercially exhibited in their original formats. The first twelve volumes of Cabin Fever's The Little Rascals VHS set were released on July 6, 1994, followed by nine more on July 11, 1995, coinciding with the theatrical and home video releases of Universal's 1994 feature. Each tape contained four shorts, as well as newly produced introductions by film historian Leonard Maltin.

With these releases, Cabin Fever made all 80 Roach sound shorts, and four silents, available for purchase unedited with digitally restored picture and sound. On August 26, 1997, a limited-edition volume, For Pete's Sake, was released in honor of the Rascals' 75th anniversary with an introduction from original cast member Tommy "Butch" Bond and "Petey," the dog from the 1994 feature. The video contained three previously released shorts and the previously unreleased silent short Dog Heaven; the VHS tape was also available in a gift set with a Pete plush doll.

Cabin Fever began pressing DVD versions of their first 12 Little Rascals VHS volumes, with the contents of two VHS volumes included on each DVD, but went out of business in 1998 before their release. The Little Rascals home video rights were then sold to Hallmark Entertainment in 1999, who released the DVDs without an official launch while cleaning out their warehouse in early 2000. Hallmark colorized a few Our Gang shorts and released them across 8 VHS tapes. Later that year, the first 10 Cabin Fever volumes were re-released on VHS with new packaging, and the first two volumes were released on DVD as The Little Rascals: Volumes 1–2. Two further Hallmark DVD collections featured ten shorts apiece and were released in 2003 and 2005, respectively.

From 2006 to 2009, Legend Films produced colorized versions of twenty-four Our Gang comedies (23 Roach entries, and the public domain MGM entry Waldo's Last Stand), which were released across five Little Rascals DVDs. In 2011, Legend Films released black and white versions of Little Rascals DVDs.

RHI Entertainment and Genius Products released an eight-disc DVD set, The Little Rascals – the Complete Collection, on October 28, 2008. This set includes all 80 Hal Roach-produced Our Gang sound short films. Most of the collection uses the 1994 restorations, while 16 shorts are presented with older Blackhawk Films transfers as their remastered copies were lost or misplaced during preparations.

On June 14, 2011, Vivendi Entertainment re-released seven of the eight DVD's from RHI/Genius Products' The Little Rascals – The Complete Collection as individual releases. This includes the 80 shorts – replacing the Blackhawk transfers on the previous set with their respective 1994 restorations – but excludes the disc featuring the extras.

1980s–2016: MGM/Warner Bros. releases
During the 1980s and 1990s, MGM released several non-comprehensive VHS tapes of its shorts, and a VHS of the feature General Spanky. After video rights for the classic MGM library reverted to their new owners, Turner Entertainment/Warner Bros., in the late 1990s, four of the MGM Our Gang shorts appeared as bonus features on Warner Bros.-issued classic film DVD releases.

In 2009, Warner Home Video released all 52 MGM Our Gang shorts in a compilation titled The Our Gang Collection: 1938–1942 (though it contains the 1943–44 shorts as well) for manufacture-on-demand (MOD) DVD and digital download. The set is available by mail order and digital download as part of the Warner Archive Collection, and is available for purchase via the iTunes Store. A MOD release of General Spanky on DVD was also released by Warner Archive in 2016.

There are many unofficial Our Gang and Little Rascals home video collections available from several other distributors, comprising shorts (both silent and sound) which have fallen into the public domain.

2021–2022: ClassicFlix restorations and releases
ClassicFlix, a company specializing in releasing classic films and TV series on home media, licensed the home video rights to Hal Roach's Our Gang sound shorts from their current owners, Sonar Entertainment.

An Indiegogo fundraiser campaign was launched to finance extensive restorations of the shorts from original 35mm nitrate film sources. When the campaign did not meet its fundraising goal, other sources of financing were sought for the restorations. The first ClassicFlix release, The Little Rascals: The ClassicFlix Restorations, Volume 1, was released on DVD and Blu-Ray on June 1, 2021, featuring the first eleven "talking" short subjects in the series from 1929 and 1930. Five further volumes followed through June 2022, comprising the rest of the Hal Roach era shorts through 1938 and also including new restorations of those shorts.

Status of ownership
Currently, the rights to the Our Gang/Little Rascals shorts are divided.

Halcyon Studios (formerly known as Sonar Entertainment, RHI Entertainment, Cabin Fever Entertainment and Hallmark Entertainment) owned the copyrights of and held the theatrical and home video rights to the Roach-produced Our Gang shorts. Halcyon acquired these after absorbing Hal Roach Studios in 1988, and both Roach's estate and Cabin Fever Entertainment in the late 1990s.

In 2022, ClassicFlix acquired the rights to the entire Hal Roach-era Our Gang catalogue (silent and sound) for home video release, and completed an extensive 4K restoration of all "sound-era" short subjects, by re-scanning from original 35mm master prints, and completing further restoration, image stabilization, and overall digital picture cleanup.  In 2023, ClassicFlix will restore the "silent-era" Our Gang catalogue, with any available elements (some from this era are considered lost films)

Paramount Global subsidiary CBS Media Ventures, through King World Productions, owns the rights to the Little Rascals trademark and has all other media rights to the 1929-1938 Roach shorts, which constitute The Little Rascals television package, with certain territory exclusions controlled by Cinematographische Commerz-Anstalt. CBS offers original black-and-white and colorized prints for syndication. The King World/CBS Little Rascals package was featured as exclusive programming (in the United States) for the American Movie Classics network from August 2001 to December 2003, with Frankie Muniz hosting. As part of a month-long tribute to Hal Roach Studios, Turner Classic Movies televised a 24-hour marathon of Roach Our Gang shorts – both sound films and silents – on January 4–5, 2011. Some of the silent Our Gangs (such as Mary, Queen of Tots and Thundering Fleas) resurfaced on TCM at this time with new music scores in stereo sound; these silent Pathé Our Gangs are now being syndicated by Mckinaw Media.

The MGM-produced Our Gang shorts, General Spanky, and the rights to the Our Gang name are owned by Warner Bros. Discovery through Turner Entertainment. Turner Entertainment acquired these assets in 1986 when its founder, Ted Turner, purchased the pre-May 1986 MGM library; Turner merged with the former Time Warner in 1996. The television rights for the MGM Our Gang shorts belong to Warner Bros. Television Distribution, and the video rights to Warner Home Video. The MGM Our Gangs today appear periodically on the Turner Classic Movies cable network. Until its closure in 2018, the MGM Our Gangs were available for streaming via the subscription-based Warner Archive Instant streaming video service.

Our Gang cast and personnel

The following is a listing of the primary child actors in the Our Gang comedies. They are grouped by the era during which they joined the series.

Roach silent period

 Ernie Morrison as Sunshine Sammy (1922–1924)
 Peggy Cartwright (1922)
 Mickey Daniels (1922–1926)
 Jackie Condon (1922–1929)
 Allen Hoskins as Farina (1922–1931)
 Jack Davis (1922–1923)
 Lassie Lou Ahern (1923–1924)
 Mary Kornman (1923–1926)
 Peggy Ahern (1923–1927)
 Joe Cobb (1923–1929)
 Andy Samuel (1923–1924)
 Eugene Jackson as Pineapple (1924–1925)
 Johnny Downs (1925–1927)
 Jay R. Smith (1925–1929)
 Bobby Young as Bonedust (1925–1931)
 Elmer "Scooter" Lowry (1926–1927)
 Jean Darling (1927–1929)
 Bobby Hutchins as Wheezer (1927–1933)
 Harry Spear (1927–1929)
 Mary Ann Jackson (1928–1931)
 Pete the Pup (1929–1938)

Roach sound period

 Norman Chaney as Chubby (1929–1931)
 Jackie Cooper (1929–1931)
 Donald Haines (1929–1933)
 Dorothy DeBorba (1930–1933)
 Matthew Beard as Stymie (1930–1935)
 Jerry Tucker (1931–1938)
 Kendall McComas as Breezy Brisbane (1932)
 Dickie Moore (1932–1933)
 George McFarland as Spanky (1932–1942)
 Tommy Bond (1932–1934 as Tommy, 1937–1940 as Butch)
 Jackie Lynn Taylor as Jane (1934)
 Scotty Beckett (1934–1935)
 Billie Thomas as Buckwheat (1934–1944)
 Carl Switzer as Alfalfa (1935–1940)
 Darla Hood (1935–1941)
 Eugene Gordon Lee as Porky (1935–1939)
 Darwood Kaye as Waldo (1937–1940)

MGM period
 Mickey Gubitosi (Robert Blake) (1939–1944)
 Janet Burston (1940–1944)
 Billy Laughlin as Froggy (1940–1944)

Notable Our Gang comedies

The following is a listing of selected Our Gang comedies, considered by Leonard Maltin and Richard W. Bann (in their book The Little Rascals: The Life and Times of Our Gang) to be among the best and most important in the series.
 1923: The Champeen, Derby Day
 1924: High Society
 1925: Your Own Back Yard, One Wild Ride
 1929: Small Talk, Cat, Dog & Co.
 1930: The First Seven Years, Pups Is Pups, Teacher's Pet, School's Out
 1931: Love Business, Little Daddy, Fly My Kite,  Dogs Is Dogs
 1932: Readin' and Writin', The Pooch, Free Wheeling, Birthday Blues
 1933: Fish Hooky, Forgotten Babies, The Kid From Borneo, Mush and Milk, Bedtime Worries
 1934: Hi'-Neighbor!, For Pete's Sake!, Mama's Little Pirate
 1935: Anniversary Trouble, Shrimps for a Day, Beginner's Luck, Our Gang Follies of 1936
 1936: Divot Diggers, Second Childhood
 1937: Glove Taps, Hearts Are Thumps, Rushin' Ballet, Night 'n' Gales, Mail and Female, Framing Youth
 1938: Three Men in a Tub, Hide and Shriek
 1939: Alfalfa's Aunt, Cousin Wilbur
 1940: Goin' Fishin', Kiddie Kure
 1942: Going to Press

References
Citations

Bibliography
 Bond, Tommy, w. Genini, Ron (1994). Darn Right It's Butch: Memories of Our Gang/The Little Rascals. Delaware: Morgan Printing. .
 Cooper, Jackie (1982). Please Don't Shoot My Dog: The Autobiography of Jackie Cooper. New York: Penguin Putnam. .
Lee, Julia (2015). Our Gang: A Racial History of The Little Rascals. Minneapolis: University of Minneapolis Press. .
 Maltin, Leonard and Bann, Richard W. (1977, rev. 1992). The Little Rascals: The Life & Times of Our Gang. New York: Crown Publishing/Three Rivers Press.

External links

 The Heustess Family Website features Our Gang images, music, bites, films, and links.
 Steve Ramsey's Our Gang Online.
 Our Gang Online in the Wayback Machine.
 King World Productions' Little Rascals licensing site.
 Detailed series and crew filmographies on The Lucky Corner Our Gang website
 Jean Darling's website. Darling was part of Our Gang from 1926 to 1929.
 Shirley Jean Rickert's website. Rickert was part of Our Gang from 1930 to 1931.
 

 
Film series introduced in 1922
American black-and-white films
Dell Comics titles
Hal Roach Studios short film series
American comedy short films
African-American-related controversies in film
Race-related controversies in film
Films about children